Klinovets is a rural locality (a selo) in Korochansky District, Belgorod Oblast, Russia. The population was 194 as of 2010. There are 3 streets.

Geography 
Klinovets is located 7 km southeast of Korocha (the district's administrative centre) by road. Polivanov is the nearest rural locality.

References 

Rural localities in Korochansky District
Belgorodsky Uyezd